Vatteluttu, popularly romanised as Vattezhuthu (and ,), was a syllabic alphabet of south India (Tamil Nadu and Kerala) and Sri Lanka used for writing the Tamil and Malayalam languages.

 belonged to the group of Tamil-Malayalam scripts among the Southern Brahmi derivatives. The script was used for centuries in inscriptions and manuscripts of south India.

Etymology 
Three possible suggestions for the etymology of the term '' are commonly proposed. Eluttu (ezhuthu) is literally 'written form' in this context; and affixed here it means 'writing system' or 'script'. 

The three suggestions are:

 Vatte + eluttu; 'rounded script'
 Vata + eluttu; 'northern script'
 Vette + eluttu; 'chiseled script'
The script was also known as Tekken-Malayalam or Nana-mona. The name "Nana-mona" is given to it because, at the time when it is taught, the words "namostu"  etc. are begun, which are spelt "nana, mona, ittanna, tuva" (that is, "na, mo and tu"), and the alphabet therefore came to be known as the "nana-mona" alphabet.

History 
 probably started developing from Tamil-Brahmi from around the 4th or 5th century AD. The earliest forms of the script have been traced to memorial stone inscriptions from the 4th century AD. It is distinctly attested in a number of inscriptions in Tamil Nadu from the 6th century AD. By the 7th to 8th centuries, it had developed into a completely separate script from Tamil-Brahmi. Its use is also attested in north-eastern Sri Lankan rock inscriptions, such as those found near Trincomalee, dated to between c. the 5th and 8th centuries AD.

 was replaced by the Pallava-Grantha script from the 7th century AD in the Pallava court. From the 11th century AD onwards the Tamil script displaced the Pallava-Grantha as the principal script for writing Tamil. In what is now Kerala,  continued for a much longer period than in Tamil Nadu by incorporating characters from Pallava-Grantha to represent Sanskrit loan words in early Malayalam. The script went on evolving in Kerala during this period and from c. the 12th century onwards.

Replacement 
  gradually developed into a script known as "Koleluttu" in Kerala. This script was more commonly used in north Kerala. It continued in use among certain Kerala communities, especially Muslims and Christians, even after the 16th century and up to the 19th century AD.
This script was more commonly used in southern Kerala. The script is not, however, the one that is ancestral to the modern Malayalam script.
The modern Malayalam script, a modified form of the Pallava-Grantha script, later replaced  for writing the Malayalam language.

Letters
The script continuously went on evolving during its period of existence (in such a way that the date of a record may be fixed approximately by reference to the script alone).
 Last quarter of the 8th century – the difference between two similar letters, such as for instance between 'p' and 'v'; and 'ṅ' and 'l' etc., was very markedly shown. 
 A few centuries later – difficult to distinguish between 'k' and 'c', 'ṅ'  and 'l', 'p' and 'v' and so on.
 17th-18 centuries – letters 'p', 'v', 'y', and 'n' and sometimes 'l' also, are alike.

Unicode
Not yet added to unicode but proposals have been made to add it.

See also 
 Tamil script
 Pallava script
 Malayalam script

References

External links 

 Tamil Nadu Government: Archaeology Department

Linguistic history of India
Brahmic scripts
Tamil language
 
Malayalam language
Javanese language